Sri Devaraj Urs Academy of Higher Education and Research (formerly Sri Devaraj Urs University) is a deemed university located in Tamaka, Kolar, Karnataka, India. It was established as Sri Devaraj Urs Medical College in 1986 by Sri Devaraj Urs Educational Trust. It was conferred deemed-to-be-university status under Section 3 of UGC Act 1956 in 25 May 2007.

History

The Medical Council of India granted recognition for the undergraduate course in its very first Inspection in 1992. Postgraduate degree courses and diploma courses are being offered since 1997 in various clinical, pre- and paraclinical courses, and the degrees awarded are recognized by Medical Council of India.

The trust has obtained Accreditation by National Assessment and Accreditation Council (NAAC, INDIA) and certification by ISO 9001-2000 in the year 2006 for its medical college. Sri Devaraj Urs Medical College is one of the few medical colleges in India to have achieved this.

A fully integrated, modular curriculum within the regulation of Medical Council of India is under preparation. They are also taught Medical Ethics and the Constitution of India.

The college maintains high standard in teaching, training and evaluation processes as evidenced by the high pass percentage with a substantial number of students securing gold medals/distinctions/first classes, in the university examinations.

R.L. Jalappa Teaching Hospital and Research Centre, Tamaka
Sri Devaraj Urs University has an 850-bed teaching hospital to accommodate the clinical-teaching requirements of undergraduate and postgraduate medical students and to satisfy its social obligation of meeting the health needs of the people of the region. Its design is hexagonal and is situated in the college campus. The ambience has a soothing effect on the patients, their attendants, students and staff.

The hospital has departments in all specialties. Each department has its own seminar hall and examination rooms in the OPD. Each specialty has male and female wards, with bed strength as per MCI requirements with attached laboratories.

Admission policy

Admissions to undergraduate and postgraduate courses are based on merit obtained in the entrance test conducted on an all-India basis. 85% of the seats are reserved for general merit candidates. 15% of the seats are reserved for NRI / NRI sponsored and foreign nationals.

Courses offered

Undergraduate Courses 
MBBS

Postgraduate courses

Sri Devaraj Urs Medical College the constituent college of the university, offers postgraduate courses in 15 subjects. Doctor of Medicine (M.D) courses in Medicine, Pediatrics, Radio-Diagnosis, Dermatology, Anesthesiology, Physiology, Pathology, Forensic Medicine, Pharmacology, Microbiology, Biochemistry and Master of Surgery (M.S) courses in Surgery, Orthopedics, Obstetrics, Gynecology, Otorhinolaryngology and Ophthalmology

Proposed courses

 Ph.D in biochemistry
 Ph.D in microbiology
 Fellowship in head and neck onco-surgery

References

Medical colleges in Karnataka
Deemed universities in Karnataka
Universities and colleges in Kolar district
1986 establishments in Karnataka
Educational institutions established in 1986